BBC Radio 1's Live Lounge 2013 is a compilation album consisting of live tracks played on Fearne Cotton's BBC Radio 1 show, both cover versions and original songs. The album was released on 28 October 2013, and is the ninth in the series of Live Lounge albums.

Track listing

Charts

References 

2013 compilation albums
2013 live albums
Live Lounge
Covers albums
Rhino Entertainment compilation albums
Sony Music compilation albums
Universal Music Group compilation albums
Universal Music TV albums